The 2003–04 Czech First League, known as the Gambrinus liga for sponsorship reasons, was the eleventh season of top-tier football in the Czech Republic.

Stadia and locations

League table

Results

Squad of the champions Baník Ostrava 
Goalkeepers
 Michal Daněk, Jan Laštůvka, Martin Raška

 Defenders
 Pavel Besta, René Bolf, Peter Drozd, Josef Dvorník, Josef Hoffmann, Aleš Neuwirth, Zdeněk Pospěch

 Midfielders
 David Bystroň, Martin Čížek, Rostislav Kiša, Radoslav Látal, Mario Lička, Miroslav Matušovič, Radek Slončík

 Forwards
 Marek Heinz, Přemysl Krpec, Lukáš Magera, Martin Prohászka, Adam Varadi, Libor Žůrek

Top goalscorers

See also
 2003–04 Czech Cup
 2003–04 Czech 2. Liga

Footnotes

References 
  ČMFS statistics

Czech First League seasons
Czech
1